Scarab Productions, Inc. is a film, television and new media production company that specializes in family entertainment.  It was founded in 2005 by producer, writer, director Rick Calabash.  The company currently has television and feature film projects in production and/or development with The Zanuck Company, Johnny Depp's Infinitum Nihil Warner Bros. Pictures and The Walt Disney Company.  It is located in Los Angeles, California.

Television 
 Our Crazy Life  (in development with The Disney Channel)

Film 
 Little Ludwig (in development with The Zanuck Company, Johnny Depp's Infinitum Nihil and Warner Bros. Pictures) 
 Mickey's PhilharMagic (2003) 
 Mickey's House of Villains (2002)
 Mickey's Magical Christmas (2001)

References

External links 
 
 Scarab Productions, Inc. at the Internet Movie Database
 

Mass media companies of the United States